The list of ship decommissionings in 1972 includes a chronological list of all ships decommissioned in 1972.


References

See also 

1972
 Ship decommissionings
Ship